George Cholmondeley may refer to:

 George Cholmondeley, 2nd Earl of Cholmondeley (1666–1733)
 George Cholmondeley, 3rd Earl of Cholmondeley (1703–1770)
 George Cholmondeley, Viscount Malpas (1724–1764), British soldier and MP
 George Cholmondeley, 1st Marquess of Cholmondeley (1749–1827)
 George Cholmondeley, 2nd Marquess of Cholmondeley (1792–1870)
 George Cholmondeley, 4th Marquess of Cholmondeley (1858–1923)
 George Cholmondeley, 5th Marquess of Cholmondeley (1883–1968)
 George Hugh Cholmondeley, 6th Marquess of Cholmondeley (1919–1990)